Edward Churchill may refer to:
 Edward Delos Churchill, American surgeon
 Edward Paycen Churchill, American theatre impressario, theatre manager, and talent agent